MUET may refer to:
 Mehran University of Engineering and Technology, Jamshoro a public university in Pakistan
 Malaysian University English Test, a test of English language proficiency, largely for university admissions